Langwith Junction is a suburb of Shirebrook, in Derbyshire, England. Its name derives from the former Shirebrook North railway station, which was on the now-defunct Lancashire, Derbyshire and East Coast Railway. It forms one of the six Langwith villages.

References 

 The Railway Clearing House Handbook of Railway Stations 1904, David & Charles reprint 1970 

Villages in Derbyshire
Bolsover District